Duke Hui II of Qin (died 387 BC) was, from 399 to 387 BC, the 27th ruler of the Zhou Dynasty Chinese state of Qin that eventually united China to become the Qin Dynasty.  His ancestral name was Ying (嬴), and Duke Hui was his posthumous title.  He was the second of the two rulers of Qin called Duke Hui.

Duke Hui's father Duke Jian of Qin was the uncle of his predecessor Duke Ling. When Duke Ling died in 415 BC, the throne was passed to his uncle Duke Jian instead of his son, the later Duke Xian.  Duke Hui then succeeded his father when Duke Jian died in 400 BC after 15 years of reign.

In 387 BC, the thirteenth year of Duke Hui's reign, Qin attacked the State of Shu and took the city of Nanzheng. Later that year, Duke Hui died and was succeeded by his young son, Chuzi II. Chuzi was then either one or two years old, and the power was controlled by his mother, the duchess dowager Qin Xiaozhu. Just two years later, in 385 BC the minister Jun Gai (菌改) rebelled against Chuzi and the duchess. He led his forces to escort Duke Xian, who was at the time exiled in the State of Wei, back to Qin, killed Chuzi and his mother, and installed Duke Xian on the throne.

References

Year of birth unknown
Rulers of Qin
4th-century BC Chinese monarchs
387 BC deaths